The 1985 Swedish Open was a men's tennis tournament played on outdoor clay courts held in Båstad, Sweden and was part of the Grand Prix circuit of the 1985 Tour. It was the 38th edition of the tournament and was held from 15 July 15 until 21 July 1985. First-seeded Mats Wilander won the singles title.

Finals

Singles

 Mats Wilander defeated  Stefan Edberg 6–1, 6–0.
 It was Wilander's 3rd singles title of the year and the 19th of his career.

Doubles

 Stefan Edberg /  Anders Järryd defeated  Sergio Casal /  Emilio Sánchez 6–0, 7–6(7–2).

References

External links
 ITF tournament edition details

Swedish Open
Swedish Open
Swedish Open
Swedish Open